Jean Evans (born July 24, 1966) is an American politician who served in the Missouri House of Representatives from the 99th district from 2017 to 2019.

References

1966 births
Living people
Republican Party members of the Missouri House of Representatives
Women state legislators in Missouri